The William Dahl House was built by William Dahl and his Irish wife, Catherine Margaret Murphy in 1858, the home was moved from 136 13th Street in 1997.

References

Houses completed in 1858
Houses in Saint Paul, Minnesota
Houses on the National Register of Historic Places in Minnesota
National Register of Historic Places in Saint Paul, Minnesota
Relocated buildings and structures in Minnesota